Minnie Craig (née Davenport, November 4, 1883 – July 2, 1966) was an American legislator, notable as the first female speaker of a state House of Representatives in the United States.

Born in Phillips, Maine on November 4, 1883 to Marshall and Aura (Prescott) Davenport, Minnie Davenport was a bright student. After graduating from the Farmington State Normal School she attended the New England Conservatory of Music and became a school teacher. She married Edward Craig in July, 1908, and they moved from Maine to Esmond, North Dakota where Edward was president of a bank. Both Craig and her husband became involved in the Nonpartisan League, and in 1923, just three years after women won the right to vote, she was elected to the North Dakota House of Representatives. She became known by the affectionate nickname, "Min", but also had a reputation as a serious and meticulous legislator. A 1927 report noted, 1

Craig served six consecutive sessions in the State legislature. During this time she also held the position of state president of the Non-Partisan League, and was a Republican National Committee woman from 1928 to 1932. In addition to forging her own political career, Craig encouraged other women to become politically active:

On January 3, 1933, she made history when she was elected Speaker of the House, the first time a woman had led a legislative body in the USA (in a permanent capacity). However, the session proved challenging for Craig. The House assembled in a temporary auditorium as the State Capitol had been consumed by fire. In addition, North Dakota was suffering from an agricultural depression caused by drought. Her tenure as an elected member of the legislature ended with that session, when she left to become a state worker for the Federal Emergency Relief Administration. The following year she returned to the House in an administrative role, as assistant to the chief clerk. In the 1937 and 1939 sessions she fulfilled the role of chief clerk.

On her retirement, Craig and her husband moved to California. She began writing an autobiography but, at 99 pages, left it unfinished around the time of the death of her husband in 1947. Craig moved back to Phillips, Maine, in 1959 and died in Farmington on July 2, 1966.

Minnie D. Craig's collected papers, consisting of her handwritten autobiography, correspondence, pamphlets and scrapbooks detailing her political and family life, are held at the North Dakota State University Institute for Regional Studies. The United Nations declared 1975 "International Women's Year" and North Dakota chose the occasion to honor Craig for her pioneering work.

See also 
List of speakers of the North Dakota House of Representatives
List of female speakers of legislatures in the United States

Further reading 
 Minnie D. Craig: Gender and Politics in North Dakota, Maren Claus, North Dakota History: Journal of the Northern Plains, Vol. 62, No. 2 & 3, 1996.

References 

1883 births
1966 deaths
People from Phillips, Maine
Speakers of the North Dakota House of Representatives
Republican Party members of the North Dakota House of Representatives
Women state legislators in North Dakota
Nonpartisan League politicians
New England Conservatory alumni
People from Benson County, North Dakota
20th-century American politicians
University of Maine at Farmington alumni
20th-century American women politicians
Women legislative speakers